New York City's 11th City Council district is one of 51 districts in the New York City Council. It has been represented by Democrat Eric Dinowitz since a 2021 special election to succeed fellow Democrat Andrew Cohen.

Geography
District 11 is based in the far northwest corner of the Bronx, covering all of Riverdale, Norwood, Van Cortlandt Village, and Woodlawn, and parts of Wakefield, Bedford Park, and Kingsbridge. Van Cortlandt Park, the city's third-largest park, is located within the district.

The district overlaps with Bronx Community Boards 7, 8, and 12, and with New York's 13th and 16th congressional districts. It also overlaps with the 33rd, 34th, and 36th districts of the New York State Senate, and with the 78th, 80th, 81st, and 83rd districts of the New York State Assembly.

Recent election results

2021
In 2019, voters in New York City approved Ballot Question 1, which implemented ranked-choice voting in all local elections. Under the new system, voters have the option to rank up to five candidates for every local office. Voters whose first-choice candidates fare poorly will have their votes redistributed to other candidates in their ranking until one candidate surpasses the 50 percent threshold. If one candidate surpasses 50 percent in first-choice votes, then ranked-choice tabulations will not occur.

2021 special
In December 2020, Councilmember Andrew Cohen resigned from his seat in order to assume his new position as a justice of the Bronx Supreme Court, triggering a special election. The election, which was won by Eric Dinowitz, was among the first in the city to use ranked-choice voting. Like all municipal special elections in New York City, the race was officially nonpartisan, with all candidates running on ballot lines of their own creation.

2017

2013

References

New York City Council districts